"Get Free" is a song by musical project Major Lazer from their second studio album Free the Universe (2013). The song was released as a digital download on May 18, 2012. The song features vocals from American singer and musician Amber Coffman.

Music video
A lyric video to accompany the release of "Get Free" was first released onto YouTube on 15 April 2012 at a total length of five minutes. The official video, directed by So Me, was released on 23 August 2012. Filmed in Kingston, Jamaica, "Get Free" takes the viewer on a candid journey of Jamaican culture. Both Coffman and Diplo make appearances.

Newton Faulkner cover
In 2015, English singer Newton Faulkner recorded "Get Free" for his fifth studio album, Human Love. The cover of the song was released as the lead single from the album on 27 November 2015, while a music video was released on 15 September 2015.

Track listing

Chart performance

Weekly charts

Year-end charts

Certifications

Release history

Popular Culture
"Get Free" was featured over the end credits of Barely Lethal (2015), and in the 2017 movie Baywatch

References

2012 singles
Major Lazer songs
Songs written by Diplo
2011 songs
Songs written by Switch (songwriter)